Church of Saint Gertrude might refer to several churches:

Collegiate Church of Saint Gertrude in Belgium
Church of St. Gertrude, Kaunas in Lithuania
St. Gertrude Roman Catholic Church, Vandergrift, Pennsylvania, USA, listed on the NRHP in Pennsylvania
St. Gertrude's Convent and Chapel, Cottonwood, Idaho, USA, listed on the NRHP in Idaho